New Aleppo is one of the largest neighborhoods in Aleppo city in Syria. It is a residential area has Aleppine's classical buildings, which was built with white stones. New Aleppo is an extension of the city to the west.

Etymology
It was called new Aleppo because it is the latest neighborhood that was built in the city, and its buildings have a lot of differences from those in other neighborhoods. The Aleppo name is maybe from Syriac means: "white city" because it has white stones and its buildings were constructed with stones.

History
Construction of the neighborhood began in the 1980s, but it was not a real suburb because the first buildings were outside the city. In 2000 the state began building an orderly neighborhood. It is now one of the largest neighborhoods in the city, and until nowadays it is expanding such as Menyan "Benyameen" quarter.

Geography and climate
The neighborhood is on a plateau in the west of the city at an elevation between 400 and 460 meters.

It has Mediterranean climate and 80% of precipitation occurs between October and March.

Subdivisions
New Aleppo consists of North New Aleppo and the more recently built South New Aleppo. Both parts have several quarters.
Two other neighborhoods that are sometimes considered part of New Aleppo are el-Zahraa neighborhood and el-Furqan neighborhood.

North New Aleppo contains:

 Muhandeseen quarter
 el-Kahraba quarter
 Masaken el-Taleem el-Alee quarter

South New Aleppo contains:

 Buhous quarter
 Masaken el-Tamween quarter
 el-Shuhada quarter
 Tawaso el-Madinah quarter
 el-Beaa quarter
 Menyan "Benyameen" quarter

Demographic

Religions
From the first construction in the neighborhood until now, most of its people have been Muslims, with some Christian families.

Mosques
There are a number of huge mosques, such as:

 Shaikh Omar el-Halaby Mosque
 el-Rahmah Mosque
 Eman Mosque
 Abdullah bin Abbas Mosque
 Saed bin Rabbie Mosque
 el-Ghufran Mosque

Ethnics
The population is 94% Arabs, 5% Kurds and 1% other or unknown ethnicity.

Languages
The people in New Aleppo speak Syrian Arabic in Aleppine tone, which has a big difference from Arabic. Also Kurds can speak Kurdish language as well as Arabic, French and English is a second foreign language as well as Arabic, but some can speak Turkish and German.

Services

Schools
There are a number of secondary and primary schools for girls and boys.

Primary schools

 Haroun el-Rasheed School
 Qoutaiba bin Muslim el-bahily School
 Othman bin Affan School
 Hessain Tabra School
 Ahmad Aswad School
 el-Moutanabby School

Secondary schools

 Mousa bin Nussair School
 Asaed Aqeel School

Posts
There is New Aleppo post.

Shops
There are two supermarkets:

New Town in Buhous quarter
One Mart close to Rahmah mosque.

There are more than 20 shops such as:

 el-Madinah el-Munawwarah
 el-Zaitouni 
 Abu Dan 
 el-Eman
 el-Ashkar

References

 Some information from old people who have lived in New Aleppo since the first buildings in it.

External links
Aleppo news

Neighborhoods of Aleppo